Srub is a Russian post-punk band from Novosibirsk, that became known in 2013.

History
The group became known in 2013, at the same time Afisha drew attention to it.

In 2015, Vice magazine wrote about the group in an article dedicated to the new generation of Russian indie artists.

Style
Srub's music has been described as post-punk, indie rock, dark folk, black metal.

Vice noted the ability of the band "to almost seamlessly combine iconography of Pagan and Slavic mysticism with the musical side, which has apparently been inspired by the likes of Bauhaus and Joy Division".

Discography

Albums
 Сруб (2014)
 Хтонь (2015)
 Песни злых цветов (2016)
 Ересь (2016)
 Скорбь (acoustic, 2018)
 Пост (2018)
 988 (2019)
 Скверна (2021)
 Веры пиры (2022)

Extended plays and singles
 По грибы (2013)
 Живица (2013)
 Природы ради снисхождения из-под паутины песни (2014)
 Тайной тропой (2014)
 Юдоль (2014)
 Безымянный (2016)
 Восход (2017)
 Упокой (2020)
 За зовом зари (2020)
 Никогда не видеть зла (2020)
 Через плечо переплюнув мечты (feat. MistFolk, 2022)

Compilations
 Топь (2014)
 Тень (2015) 
 Туман (2015)
 Иные (2019)

Splits
почему коммутатор молчит / Сруб (2015)

Music videos
 Сердце (2018)
 След в след (2018)
 Помни (2018)
 До горизонта земли (2018)
 988 (2019)

References

External links
 "Сруб": русский народный пост-панк из Сибири. Российская газета.
 «Черти в «Срубе» — настоящие». Афиша Daily.
 Official website.

Musical groups from Novosibirsk
Russian post-punk music groups